Shane Ivey is an American game designer who has worked primarily on role-playing games.

Career
Shane Ivey worked for Pagan Publishing. After the release of Godlike in 2002 Dennis Detwiller and Ivey founded Arc Dream Publishing. Ivey and Detwiller formed Arc Dream Publishing at a time when Pagan Publishing was shutting down its main operations; their original intent was to publish supplements for Godlike. Detwiller and Ivey produced Delta Green: Targets of Opportunity (2010) and resurrected The Unspeakable Oath with issue #18 (December 2010). Through Arc Dream Publishing, Ivey edited and published other games including Monsters and Other Childish Things, Wild Talents, Puppetland, and Better Angels. Ivey contributed to the books Rivendell, Horse-lords of Rohan, and Oaths of the Riddermark for Cubicle 7 Entertainment's J.R.R. Tolkien-based roleplaying game The One Ring Roleplaying Game. Ivey cowrote Delta Green: The Role-Playing Game with Dennis Detwiller, Adam Scott Glancy, and Greg Stolze, and cowrote or published 34 books in the award-winning Delta Green line between 2015 and 2020.

References

External links
 

Living people
Place of birth missing (living people)
Role-playing game designers
Year of birth missing (living people)